Israel Putnam (January 7, 1718 – May 29, 1790), popularly known as "Old Put", was an American military officer and landowner who fought with distinction at the Battle of Bunker Hill during the American Revolutionary War (1775–1783). He also served as an officer with Rogers' Rangers during the French and Indian War (1754–1763), when he was captured by Mohawk warriors. He was saved from the ritual burning given to enemies by the intervention of a French officer with whom the Mohawk were allied. Putnam's courage and fighting spirit became known far beyond his home of Connecticut's borders through the circulation of folk legends in the American colonies and states celebrating his exploits.

Early life

Israel Putnam was born in 1718 in Salem Village (now Danvers), Massachusetts to Joseph and Elizabeth (Porter) Putnam, a prosperous farming Puritan family. His parents had opposed the Salem witch trials in the 1690s. With his father-in-law Israel Porter, Joseph Putnam signed a petition on the behalf of the elderly Rebecca Nurse, who was accused of witchcraft, but the jury overturned its first verdict of innocent, convicting her and sentencing her to death. One of her sisters was also executed in the hysteria of the time.

In 1740, at the age of 22, the young Putnam moved west to Mortlake (in a part of the town that later became part of Pomfret and Brooklyn in northeastern Connecticut), where land was cheaper and easier for young men to buy. Putnam killed a wolf in Connecticut in 1743 with the help of a group of farmers from Mortlake seeking to safeguard their sheep. After tracking the wolf to her den, they tried sending in their dogs, but all the dogs returned frightened, or in several cases, injured by the wolf. They tried smoking the wolf out, and after that failed, they tried burning sulfur at the mouth of the rocky cave, all to no avail. After Putnam arrived, he tried getting his dog to enter the den, with no luck. He also tried to get his servant to enter with a torch and gun to shoot the wolf. His servant refused, as did all the other farmers. Putnam then reportedly crawled into the den with a torch, a musket loaded with buckshot, and his feet secured with rope to be quickly pulled out. While in the den, he killed the wolf.

In celebration of the event, the 24-year-old Putnam was carried in a torch-lit procession through Pomfret in a celebration that lasted until about midnight. Putnam earned the nicknames of "Wolf Putnam" and "Old Wolf Put", which stayed with him for decades afterward. A section of Mashamoquet Brook State Park in modern-day Pomfret, including the den, is named "Wolf Den". The name "Wolf Den Road" in adjacent Brooklyn, Connecticut, also attests to the days of wolves.

Putnam married twice, first to Hannah Pope in 1739, the mother of his children.  Two years after her death in 1765, he married Deborah Lothrop.

Early military service
In 1755, at the age of 37, Putnam was one of the first men in Connecticut to sign up to serve as a private in the militia in the French and Indian War. During the war, he would be successively promoted to second lieutenant, captain, major, lieutenant colonel, and colonel. As a company captain, Putnam served with Robert Rogers, who would gain fame as the commander of Rogers' Rangers, and the two of them had various exploits together, in one of which Putnam saved Rogers' life. Putnam's reputation for courage was made famous by his participation in the war. It was said that "Rogers always sent, but Putnam led his men to action." 

In 1757, the Rangers were stationed on an island off Fort Edward (village), New York Fort Edward. The following February, Putnam and his Rangers were still on Roger's Island when fire broke out in the row of barracks nearest the magazine. The danger of an explosion was imminent, but Putnam took a position on the roof and poured bucket after bucket of water upon the flames, only descending when the buildings fell only a few feet from the magazine. In spite of his severe wounds, he continued to fight the fire, dashing water upon the magazine until the fire was under control. He was laid up for a month due to burns and exposure. 

Putnam was captured on August 8, 1758, by Kahnawake (Mohawk people) Native Americans from a mission settlement south of Montreal during a military campaign near Crown Point in Province of New York New York. He was saved from being ritually burned alive by a rainstorm and the last-minute intervention of a French officer. 

In 1759, Putnam led a regiment into The Valley of Death in the attack on Fort Ticonderoga Fort Carillon; and, in 1760, he was with the British army that marched on Montreal. In 1762, he survived a shipwreck during the Siege of Havana British expedition against Cuba that led to the capture of Havana. Major Putnam is believed to have brought back Cuban tobacco seeds to New England, which he planted in the Hartford, Connecticut Hartford area. This reportedly resulted in the development of the renowned Connecticut shade tobacco Connecticut Wrapper. In 1763, during Pontiac's War Pontiac's Rebellion, Putnam was sent with reinforcements to relieve Chief Pontiac's siege of Fort Detroit. 

After the war, he returned to his homestead, a remnant of which exists today as Putnam Farm in Brooklyn, Connecticut. Putnam publicly professed his Christian faith following the Seven Years' War in 1765 and joined the Congregational church Congregational Church in his town.  He was among those who objected to Kingdom of Great Britain British tax action policies. Around the time of the Stamp Act crisis in 1766, he was elected to the Connecticut General Assembly and was one of the founders of the state's chapter of the Sons of Liberty. In the fall of 1765, he threatened Thomas Fitch, the popularly elected List of governors of Connecticut Governor of Connecticut, over this issue. He said that Fitch's house "will be leveled with the dust in five minutes" if Fitch did not turn over the stamp tax paper to the Sons of Liberty.

American Revolutionary War

Battle of Bunker Hill
By the eve of the American Revolution, Putnam had become a relatively prosperous farmer and tavern keeper, with more than a local reputation for his previous exploits. On April 20, 1775, while plowing one of his fields with his son, he received news of the Battle of Lexington and Concord that started the war the day before. He literally "came off the plow", leaving it in the field and riding  in eight hours, reaching Cambridge the next day and offering his services to the Patriot cause. Putnam was named a major general, making him second in rank to General Artemas Ward in the Army of Observation, which preceded the founding of the Continental Army.

Putnam was one of the primary figures at the Battle of Bunker Hill in June 1775, both in its planning and on the battlefield. During the battle, Putnam may have ordered William Prescott to tell his troops, "Don't fire until you see the whites of their eyes." It is debated exactly who said these words first; they are attributed to a number of officers. This command has since become one of the American Revolution's notable quotations. It was given to make the best use of the low ammunition stocks that the troops had.

In the planning for the Battle of Bunker Hill, Putnam was likely the one who argued in favor of also fortifying the adjacent hill, which later became known as "Breed's Hill". This hill was closer to Boston, and from the hill cannons could fire on the British forces in Boston, forcing them to come out and attack the hill. The British soldiers were mowed down as they marched toward the American fortifications. However, the Americans ran out of powder and were eventually forced to retreat. American casualties were 449, while British casualties were 1,054. By the standard of the day the Americans lost, since they gave up the ground. However, Continental Army Brigadier General Nathanael Greene wrote to his brother that "I wish we could sell them another hill, at the same price."

Years after the battle, and after Putnam's death, he was accused by Henry Dearborn of failing to supply reinforcements and even of cowardice during the battle. The accusations created a long-standing controversy among veterans, family, friends, and historians. People were shocked by the rancor of the attack, and this prompted a forceful response from defenders of Putnam, including such notables as John and Abigail Adams. Historian Harold Murdock wrote that Dearborn's account "abounds in absurd misstatements and amazing flights of imagination." The Dearborn attack received considerable attention because at the time he was in the middle of controversy himself. He had been relieved of one of the top commands in the War of 1812 due to his mistakes. He had also been nominated to serve as U.S. Secretary of War by President James Monroe, but was rejected by the United States Senate (which was the first time that the Senate had voted against confirming a presidential cabinet choice).

Long Island and later service

On June 14, 1775, the Continental Congress voted to create the Continental Army. George Washington was chosen as Commander-in-Chief, with Putnam and three others appointed as major generals under Washington. Of the votes, only Washington and Putnam were unanimous.

After Bunker Hill, Washington arrived and Putnam served under him in the Siege of Boston. Due largely to the ingenious efforts of Henry Knox and Putnam's cousin Rufus Putnam, the British were forced to abandon Boston.

Putnam subsequently served as temporary commander of the American forces in New York while waiting for Washington's arrival there on April 13, 1776. Putnam's fortunes declined at the Battle of Long Island in August 1776, where he was forced to effect a hasty retreat from the British. Some in the Second Continental Congress blamed Putnam for the defeat, but Washington, who was in overall command and witnessed the battle, did not.

It is possible that Putnam's efforts saved Washington's life or prevented his capture. As Senator Daniel Patrick Moynihan described it, "...it could be argued that we owe our national existence to the fortifications which General Israel Putnam threw up in April 1776 on the Buttermilk Channel side [of Governors Island, New York]... [British troops] landed on Long Island and headed for George Washington and his army. He had to flee, and he made it because Putnam's artillery firing on Brooklyn Heights, over the Buttermilk Channel, held Howe back just long enough for Washington to escape to Manhattan and for the Revolutionary War to proceed."

With future Vice President Aaron Burr in his charge, Putnam was fooled in October 1777 by a feint executed by British troops under the command of General Sir Henry Clinton, making way for Clinton's capture of Fort Montgomery and Fort Clinton. As was standard procedure, Putnam was relieved of command and brought before a court of inquiry for these losses. It was ascertained that the events in question were the result of a lack of men, not of the fault of any commander, and he was exonerated of any wrongdoing.

Putnam had personal friendships and deep respect for many of his British former comrades in arms in the French and Indian War, who were now his enemies. While in command in New York, there were several occasions on which he showed personal courtesies, such as providing newspapers to read or medical attention, to British officers who had become his prisoners of war. This offended many New Yorkers. He also showed an "unconquerable aversion" to many of those who were entrusted with the disposal of Tory property who Putnam felt were instead embezzling the funds. This also led to Putnam becoming unpopular with many influential New Yorkers, who complained to Washington.

Washington had also lost some of his faith in Putnam, due to an incident in which Putnam delayed in forwarding troops to Washington when first ordered to do so. One possible explanation was that his wife, mistaken for dead, had apparently been buried alive, expiring in the casket after burial. The grave was later exhumed, and it is possible that Putnam learned of the tragic error at the time he received Washington's order. Regardless, Washington felt he could not have Putnam in charge of troops in New York without the support of that state, and transferred Putnam to recruiting duties in Connecticut after the court of inquiry finished its investigation of the loss of Forts Montgomery and Clinton. Putnam was later put in command of the Eastern Division, consisting of three brigades of New Hampshire and Connecticut troops. In 1779, he was put in command of the right wing of the army, which included the Virginia, Maryland, and Pennsylvania divisions.

During the winter of 1778–1779, Putnam and his troops were encamped at the site now preserved as the Putnam Memorial State Park in Redding, Connecticut. On February 26, 1779, Putnam escaped from the British, riding down a steep slope in Greenwich, Connecticut, for which he became famous. A statue commemorating this escape was erected at Putnam Memorial State Park. In December 1779, Putnam suffered a paralyzing stroke, which ended his military service.

Personality and characteristics
Israel Putnam did not fit the stereotype of the taciturn New Englander.  He was a gregarious tavern-keeper, a very industrious farmer, and an aggressive soldier, always looking for an excuse to discipline his soldiers. His farm was one of the most productive in the area (he was able to buy out his partner and pay off his mortgage after only two years). In battle, he would lead from the front, not from behind. And after hours, he would lead his comrades in singing the popular drinking songs of the day.

Putnam served as Washington's second in command, and the two shared some key characteristics that other general officers of the time did not.  Neither one of them had as much education as elite people of the era had.  Putnam's lack of education and unsophisticated manner prompted a captured Hessian officer to comment that "This old gray-beard may be a good honest man, but nobody but the rebels would have made him a general."  Some of America's proper Philadelphians agreed.  The common soldier admired Putnam's courage though, and could see from his many visible battle scars that he knew what it was like to be on the front lines.  They knew that he had achieved his position through first-hand experience, rather than just education or family connections.  Historian Nathaniel Philbrick says flatly that "Israel Putnam was the provincial army's most beloved officer."

Putnam, whose spelling was a language all its own, nevertheless had a way with words.  Both Washington and Putnam had to use their words to put down mutinies (on separate occasions) by their long-suffering, disgruntled troops.  Biographer David Humphreys, who witnessed the Putnam event, wrote about it as follows:

"The troops who had been badly fed, badly cloathed and worse paid ... formed the design of marching to Hartford, where the General Assembly was then in session, and of demanding redress at the point of the bayonet.  Word having been brought to General Putnam that the second Brigade was under arms for this purpose, he mounted his horse, galloped to the Cantonment and thus addressed them:

"'My brave lads, whither are you going?  Do you intend to desert your Officers and to invite the enemy to follow you into the country?  Whose cause have you been fighting and suffering so long in, is it not your own?  Have you no property, no parents, wives or children?  You have behaved like men so far – all the world is full of your praises – and posterity will stand astonished at your deeds: but not if you spoil all at last.  Don't you consider how much the country is distressed by the war, and that your officers have not been any better paid than yourselves?  But we all expect better times and that the Country will do us ample justice.  Let us all stand by one another then and fight it out like brave Soldiers.  Think what a shame it would be for Connecticut men to run away from their officers.'"

Putnam's speech worked.  After he finished, "he directed the acting Major of Brigade to give the word for them to shoulder, march to their Regimental parades, and lodge arms.  All of which they executed with promptitude and apparent good humor."

After hearing of the mutiny, Washington wrote to Putnam commending him for his success in quelling it.  Putnam wrote to Washington that the incident had "not been repeated, or attended with any farther ill consequences.".

Both Washington and Putnam were aggressive by nature, and did not hesitate to put themselves in harm's way if that was what was called for in battle.  Both were either fearless, or at least able to function calmly while bullets whizzed around them.  Yet, each was nevertheless able to calculate risk and make decisions accordingly.  After leading inexperienced men in a successful engagement while being bombarded with cannonballs, Putnam commented, "I wish we could have something of the kind to do every day; it would teach our men how little danger there is from cannon balls, for though they have sent a great many at us, nobody has been hurt by them."

Putnam has been criticized by historians as having not been a great strategic thinker, and during one of the planning sessions during the siege of Boston with Washington and his senior officers, Putnam grew tired of the endless discussion, and went to the window and started observing the British.  Washington invited him back to the planning table, and Putnam responded, "Oh, my dear General, you may plan the battle to suit yourself, and I will fight it."

Putnam though, was not without the ability to foresee both effective battlefield strategy and the big picture.  He ordered his men to aim for the British officers, knowing the crippling effect it would have.  He knew the value of inoculating the American troops against small pox, and the tendency of nervous soldiers to fire too soon and aim too high (possibly thus the orders to not fire until "you see the whites of their eyes" and to "Take aim at the waistbands."). 
 
Putnam had a feel for the common soldier and how to make good use of him.  He knew that a soldier was not worried about his head, but if you protected his body with earthworks, he would "fight forever."  Putnam also understood that a retreat could be a very effective tactic.  "Let me pick my officers, and I would not fear to meet [the enemy] with half the number...  I would fight them on the retreat, and every stone wall we passed should be lined with their dead ... our men are lighter of foot, they understand their grounds and how to take advantage of them…"

For one who was not supposed to be much of a strategic thinker, in some cases he was more prescient than his fellow generals.  In discussion with Joseph Warren and General Artemas Ward before the Battle of Bunker Hill, Putnam advocated aggressive action against the British.  Ward replied that "As peace and reconciliation is what we seek for, would it not be better to act only on the defensive and give no unnecessary provocation?"  Putnam turned to Warren and said with emphasis, "You know, Dr. Warren, we shall have no peace worth anything, till we gain it by the sword."

Shortly after Washington took command at Cambridge in 1775, he and the other generals hoped for a speedy resolution of the war.  On one occasion with them gathered around his dinner table, Washington offered a toast: "A speedy and honorable peace."  A few days later, Putnam offered a different one: "A long and moderate war."  The sober and seldom-smiling Washington laughed out loud.  Washington addressed Putnam, "You are the last man, General Putnam, from whom I should have expected such a toast, you who are always urging vigorous measures, to plead now for a long, and what is still more extraordinary, a moderate, war, seems strange indeed."  Putnam replied that a false peace would divide Americans and not be long-lasting.  Putnam went on, "I expect nothing but a long war, and I would have it a moderate one, that we may hold out till the mother country becomes willing to cast us off forever."

The Revolutionary War would drag on for eight and a half years, the longest in United States history until the Vietnam War. Washington did not soon forget Putnam's prescient toast. For years after, and more than once, he reminded Putnam of it.

Burial

Putnam died in Brooklyn, Connecticut, in 1790. He was buried in an above-ground tomb in the town's South Cemetery. He is honored with an equestrian monument near his original burial site on Canterbury Road (Route 169).

Over the years, souvenir hunters removed fragments of the headstone of his tomb and eventually the marble marker became badly mutilated and the overall condition of the tomb was deemed unsuitable for General Putnam's remains; it was removed for safekeeping to the Connecticut State Capitol in Hartford. Sculptor Karl Gerhardt, who designed the nearby Soldiers' and Sailors' Monument as well as Civil War monuments in New York and New Jersey, was chosen to create a monument to house Putnam's remains. In 1888, Putnam's remains were removed from the Brooklyn cemetery and reinterred in a sarcophagus in the base, and the original headstone inscription was recreated on the monument.

Legacy, namesakes, and honors

Putnam's birthplace in Danvers, Massachusetts, now known as the Putnam House, has been designated and preserved as a historic structure. His Connecticut farmhouse on Putnam Farm still stands today and is listed on the National Register of Historic Places. A statue of Israel Putnam stands in Hartford's Bushnell Park, near the Connecticut State Capitol. It was sculpted by John Quincy Adams Ward in 1873 and presented to the city in 1874.

Numerous places bear his name, including nine counties, starting with Putnam County, New York, which embraces the east bank of the Hudson Highlands where he once held command. Towns in New York and Connecticut are also named for him. His many namesakes include:
 Putnam County, Georgia
 Putnam County, Illinois
 Putnam County, Indiana
 Putnam County, Missouri
 Putnam County, New York
 Putnam County, Ohio
 Putnam County, Tennessee
 Putnam County, West Virginia
 Putnam, Connecticut
 Putnam, New York
 Israel Putnam Refectory, a dining hall at the University of Connecticut
 East Putnam Avenue in Greenwich, Connecticut, named for his path of retreat from the British
Putnam's cottage, an 18th-century residence that may have served as a tavern at the time of his escape, located on East Putnam Avenue in Greenwich
 Putnam Farm, the remnant of Putnam's original 500-acre holding in Brooklyn, Connecticut
 Putnam Memorial State Park, the oldest state park in Connecticut where there is an Equestrian statue of Israel Putnam by Anna Hyatt Huntington which dedicated in 1969
 Putnam Avenue, in Port Chester, New York, a continuation of the avenue of the same name in Greenwich, CT.
 Putnam Drive, in Port Chester, New York
 Putnam Avenue in Hamden, Connecticut
 Putnam Avenue in Brooklyn, New York
 Putnam Street in Scranton, Pennsylvania
 Putnam Street in Olean, New York
 Putnam Pond and Putnam Creek in Ticonderoga and Crown Point, NY
 Putnam Place in the Bronx, New York, which stands among other local neighborhood streets named for figures from the Revolutionary War and War of 1812
 Israel Putnam Brown Ale, a beer brewed by Black Pond Brews of Danielson, Connecticut
 Putnam Avenue in Cambridge, Massachusetts
 Putnam Engine & Hose Co., No. 2, a Company of the Port Chester, New York Fire Department organized in 1854  
 Putnam Russet Apple. Putnam had a very successful farm in Brooklyn, Connecticut, which was known for its apples and sheep. The farmhouse at Putnam Farm still stands, and the Putnam Russet is still grown by farmers of heirloom apple varieties.
 Putnam Pond, a body of water (and adjacent campground) near Ticonderoga, New York, known locally as "Putt's Pond"
 Several ships including the USS General Putnam

Putnam has been featured in numerous biographies and works of fiction, including an 1876 biography by Increase N. Tarbox, a historian, theologian, and author, and as the name of the first motel visited by the characters in the 1992 motion picture My Cousin Vinny. He also appeared in Assassin's Creed III in a minor role.

His descendant John Day Putnam became a member of the Wisconsin State Assembly.

References

Bibliography

, 394 pages
, 394 pages

 
 
 

, pages covering account

Further reading
  (a biography by Frederick Albion Ober)
 "'Violent' war mural may not go back to school", Greenwich Time, 5 June 2006
 "Heroic America – James Daugherty's Mural Drawings from the 1930s"

External links

 Israel Putnam Website
 
 The Massachusetts Historical Society
 Putnam Cottage Historic House Museum
  Danvers Historical Society webpage - owner of the General Israel Putnam House

1718 births
1790 deaths
American people of English descent
British America army officers
British military personnel of the French and Indian War
Burials in Connecticut
Continental Army generals
Continental Army officers from Connecticut
Military personnel from Connecticut
Military personnel from Massachusetts
People of colonial Connecticut
People of Connecticut in the American Revolution
People from Danvers, Massachusetts
People from Brooklyn, Connecticut
Israel